Marine Township is located in Madison County, Illinois, in the United States. As of the 2010 census, its population was 2,243 and it contained 920 housing units.

History
Marine Township was named by the sea captains who settled there.

Geography

Demographics

References

External links
City-data.com
Illinois State Archives

Townships in Madison County, Illinois
Townships in Illinois